Koći is a village in the municipality of Tuzi, Montenegro, near the border with Albania. The village is inhabited by ethnic Albanians of the Roman Catholic faith.

Geography

Koći lies east of the capital Podgorica, north of Ubli. Koći is a village in Koja e Kuçit, eastern Montenegro, bordering Albania.

Along with Albanian-inhabited Hoti and Gruda, Koći is, from Albanian point of view, part of the wider Malësia-region (Malesija).

History
At the beginning of the Montenegrin–Ottoman War, the Kuči rose up against the Ottomans, who started dispatching soldiers at the frontier, including at Koći. 

According to Spiridon Gopčević, the area of Koći included 10 km2 and 550 inhabitants, out of which 480 were Catholics, 40 Orthodox, and 25 Muslims (1877).

20th century
Traveler Arso Milatović (who wrote a travel book on his experiences 1935–45) stayed at Koći and described it as "a village neighbouring Malesia, misplaced and rugged, which a horse can't reach, thus donkeys and mules walk the rocks as squirrels on branches". The inhabitants were Catholics, and the village had a church and priest, fra Marko. A church was built by the ethnic Albanian migrant workers who left the village for Europe in the period of 1964–74. The village population has since massively decreased.

Culture
Some Albanian Catholics have the custom of family and tribe celebration of saints (called festa in Peja), as is found in the Serbian Orthodox tradition of krsna slava.

Notable people
Pretash Zekaj Ulaj (1882-1962), commander in the Battle of Deçiq against the Ottoman Empire.

References

Sources

External links
 

 
Populated places in Tuzi Municipality
Albanian communities in Montenegro